Robert Floyd Kennon Sr. (August 21, 1902 – January 11, 1988), was an American politician and judge who served as the 48th governor of Louisiana, an associate justice of the Louisiana Supreme Court, a judge of the Louisiana Second Circuit Court of Appeal, the district attorney of Bossier Parish and Webster Parish, and mayor of Minden, Louisiana. During Kennon's governorship, he additionally served as chairman of the National Governors Association and  chairman of the Council of State Governments.

Early life
Kennon was born near Minden, Louisiana. He graduated from Minden High School in 1919 and then went to Louisiana State University. While at LSU, Kennon played football and tennis. He completed his undergrad there in 1923 and his law degree there in 1925.

Career
In 1925, Kennon was elected mayor of Minden, Louisiana, at the age of 23. He served in that position until 1928. In 1930, he became district attorney for Bossier Parish. He served as a district attorney until 1940. He also served as district attorney in Webster Parish. Apparently he was attorney for both parishes at the same time.

Kennon was elected to the 2nd circuit court of appeals in 1940. However, he instead of serving joined the United States military and did not take up active service as a judge until after World War II.

While governor, Kennon reestablished the state civil service in Louisiana, which had been abolished by his predecessor Earl Long. He also advocated constitutional amendments to limit the power of the governor's office. He also worked to create home rule for New Orleans and end state government interference in local issues there. Other things Kennon did while governor were ensuring that every precinct had a voting machine while working to suppress illegal slot machines and gambling in the state. During Kennon's governorship, he additionally served as chairman of the National Governors Association from 1954 to 1955, and as chairman of the Council of State Governments in 1955.

References

External links
 
 State of Louisiana - Biography
 Cemetery Memorial by La-Cemeteries
 

|-

|-

1902 births
1988 deaths
20th-century American judges
United States Army personnel of World War II
American Presbyterians
Circuit court judges in the United States
Democratic Party governors of Louisiana
District attorneys in Louisiana
Louisiana state court judges
Louisiana State University alumni
Justices of the Louisiana Supreme Court
LSU Tigers football players
LSU Tigers tennis players
Mayors of Minden, Louisiana
Minden High School (Minden, Louisiana) alumni
People from Dubberly, Louisiana
Politicians from Baton Rouge, Louisiana
United States Army colonels
Old Right (United States)